Erimi is a village lying partly in the Limassol District of Cyprus and partly in the British Overseas Territory of Akrotiri and Dhekelia. It has a population of 1,432 according to the 2001 census. It has recently increased in size with the addition of the district "Aphrodite Gardens", a new area just developed for expatriates of mainly British origin.

Close to Erimi is the village of Kolossi, which is where one can find the castle of Kolossi.

Cyprus Wine Museum 
The Cyprus Wine Museum (Οινομουσείο) is situated in Erimi village at the crossroads of the wine routes leading to the mountains and on the old road between Limassol and Paphos.

The Cyprus Wine Museum, using traditional and contemporary methods presents a journey through centuries of Cyprus wine history. Ancient jars and vases, medieval drinking vessels, the private collection of Anastasia Guy, old documents and instruments illustrate how wine was produced, stored and enjoyed in the past. Photographic backdrops and audiovisual equipment bring all aspects of wine making to life, from cultivation to production.

References 

Communities in Limassol District